Cara Morey (née Gardner; born July 31, 1978) is the head coach of Princeton University's Women's Ice Hockey team, the Tigers, and a former women's ice hockey player that has competed with Canada's Under-22 National Team. In July 2016, she was named an assistant coach of Canada women's national under-18 ice hockey team for the 2016-17 season. Prior to the appointment, she captured gold as an assistant coach with Canada's National Women's Development Team at the 2015 Nations Cup.

Playing career
Raised in Hensall, Ontario, Morey was a gold-medalist with Canada's National Women's Under-22 Team at the 2000 Nations Cup, contested in Füssen, Germany. A former competitor for the Brown Bears women's ice hockey and field hockey programs, Morey was the winner of the Ivy League Rookie of the Year Award for field hockey in 1999. As a field hockey competitor, she led the team in both goals (15) and points (38) during the 2000 season. In addition, she would earn Second Team Regional All-American recognition for her efforts in the 2000 season. As of 2015, Morey ranked fifth all-time in goals (27) and sixth overall in points (66) among Brown Bears field hockey competitors.

In her final ice hockey season with the Brown Bears, she registered 12 points (six goals, six assists) in 28 games played, including three power play goals and one game-winning goal, respectively. During her time as a member of the ice hockey team, the Bears qualified for three AWCHA National Championship Tournament appearances.

Upon graduation, she played two seasons in the original NWHL, spending her first season with the Montreal Wingstar and her second season with the Brampton Thunder.

Her competitive playing career was disrupted in 2003 due to a snowmobiling accident, in which she broke a femur.

Coaching career
While her husband, former NFL player Sean Morey, competed for the Pittsburgh Steelers, she was a coach at Robert Morris University in Moon Township, Pennsylvania. In addition, she would spend time as a coach with the Phoenix Lady Coyotes U-19 AAA team. Her involvement with the team was attributed to her husband joining the Arizona Cardinals later in his career.

Since 2011, Morey served as the associate head coach of the women's hockey team at Princeton University, alongside Jeff Kampersal. In the summer of 2017, Morey was appointed Head Coach of The Princeton Women's Ice Hockey team when Kampersal left to be head coach at Pennsylvania State University. During the length of her tenure there, she helped lead the Tigers to the ECAC quarterfinals five times as well as the ECAC semifinals when Princeton went 20-10-3. She also was crucial to Princeton's run to the 2016 Ivy League championship and at-large berth in the NCAA tournament. As of 2017, Princeton had nine All-ECAC and 18 All-Ivy League selections during her years with the team. She helped Kelsey Koelzer earn first-team All-America honors in 2016, and recruited and developed goalie Steph Neatby, the 2017 USCHO Division I Rookie of the Year. 

Morey participated in national sports organization Hockey Canada's female coach development initiative to promote world-class performance and leadership skills.

Awards and honours
1999 Ivy League Rookie of the Year Award (Field Hockey)
2001 Ivy League First All-Star Team (Ice Hockey)
2001 ECAC Second All-Star Team in 2000-01 (Ice Hockey)
2001: Brown Bears best defensive player award
2001: Ivy League All-Academic Team

Personal
Morey graduated from Brown University in 2001.

Her husband Sean Morey was a member of the Pittsburgh Steelers roster that won Super Bowl XL. Together, they have three daughters: Devan, Kathryn and Shea.

References

1978 births
Living people
Brampton Thunder players
Canadian women's ice hockey players
College women's ice hockey coaches in the United States
Ice hockey people from Ontario
People from Huron County, Ontario
Brown Bears women's ice hockey players
Princeton Tigers women's ice hockey
Princeton Tigers coaches